Parque de las Leyendas is a zoo in the San Miguel district of Lima, Peru. The zoo contain 215 species of mammals, reptiles and birds, with a total of 2071 animals.

References

External links

 

Zoo
Buildings and structures in Lima